The University of Reunion Island (Université de la Réunion) is a French university in the Academy of Réunion. It is the first and only European university in the Indian Ocean. Established in 1982, it has grown steadily over the years in terms of student population, geographical sites occupied, courses offered and partnerships forged with local, national and international institutions. The school's ambition is to be the reference university in Indianoceania.

The University has 123 ERASMUS+ inter-institutional agreements. Its European project EVAL-IC (Evaluation of Competences in Intercomprehension) has been awarded the "good practice" label by the Erasmus+ France Agency, given to projects that present "high quality implementation and results".

History 
In 1982: the faculty of "Law and Economics" was the first faculty at the University of Reunion, followed by the faculty "Sciences and Technologies" and the faculty "Letters and Humanities".

In 2005 : creation of the fourth faculty "Human and Environmental Sciences".

In 2010 : creation of the "Health" faculty

Key figures 
 594 administrative staff

 18,910 students for the 2020/2021 year

 Over 5% foreign students for the year 2020/2021

 3 doctoral schools

 2% of doctoral students for the year 2015/2016

 18 laboratories (including 5 UMR) and 1 internal laboratory

 47 theses defended in 2012-2013

 4 research and development platforms

Teaching and research

Institutes and schools 

 Institute of Business Administration
 University Institute of Technology
 Confucius Institute
 Institute of Illiteracy
 National Institute of Teacher Training and Education
 Superior School of Engineering Reunion Indian Ocean
 observatory of the sciences of the universe
 Apprentice Training Center

Doctoral Schools 

 Doctoral School - Law, Economics and Management
 Doctoral School - Technology and Health Sciences
 Doctoral School - Humanities and Social Sciences

Campuses 
Its main campus is located near the Rectorate and the headquarters of the Regional Council of La Réunion, in Moufia, Saint-Denis. The university has four other campuses, the Parc Technologique in Bellepierre, the Institut d'administration des entreprises in La Victoire, the faculty in Le Tampon which offers licenses in economic and social administration and law, as well as the Institut universitaire de la technologie in Saint-Pierre in the southwest of the island. The amphitheaters have been named after great scientists who have worked in Reunion, among them :

 Philibert Commerson
 Thérésien Cadet
 Georges Charpak

Le Tampon hosts the Technopole de La Réunion park, in Saint-Denis, some related services.

Notable people
Faculty
 Chantal Conand (born 1943) - marine biologist
 Adrian Mathias (born 1944) - British mathematician working in set theory. The forcing notion Mathias forcing is named for him.
 Hajasoa Vololona Picard (born 1956, in Antananarivo, Madagascar) - literature and linguistics specialist, politician (PS) and writer

Alumni
 Philippe Naillet (born 1960 in Saint-Denis, Réunion) - politician (PS)
 Jean-Régis Ramsamy (born 1966, in Saint-André, Réunion) - reporter, historian and writer
 Ericka Bareigts (born 1967, in Saint-Denis, Réunion) - politician (PS), Minister of Overseas France
 Johnson Roussety (born 1975) - Chief Commissioner of Rodrigues, Mauritius

See also
 List of public universities in France by academy

References

University of La Reunion
Educational institutions established in 1982
1982 establishments in Réunion
Universities and colleges in Saint-Denis, Réunion
Universities in Réunion